John David Michael Walshe is a New Zealand former professional rugby league footballer who played in the 1960s.

International honours
Walshe represented New Zealand on the 1965 New Zealand rugby league tour of Great Britain and France.

References

External links
Search for "John" at rugbyleagueproject.org
Search for "David" at rugbyleagueproject.org
Search for "Michael" at rugbyleagueproject.org
Search for "Walshe" at rugbyleagueproject.org

Canterbury rugby league team players
Living people
New Zealand national rugby league team players
New Zealand rugby league players
Otago rugby league team players
Place of birth missing (living people)
Rugby league five-eighths
Year of birth missing (living people)